The Wateree were a Native American tribe in the interior of the present-day Carolinas. They probably belonged to the Siouan-Catawba language family. First encountered by the Spanish in 1567 in Western North Carolina, they migrated to the southeast and what developed as South Carolina by 1700, where English colonists noted them.  

There they had settled along the Wateree River, near the site of what developed as present-day Camden, South Carolina. Originally a large tribe, they suffered high mortality during the Yamasee War of 1715 and became extinct as a tribe by the end of the century.

Language and name
The name Wateree may come from Catawban wateran, "to float on the water" or from yeh is-WAH h'reh, meaning "people of the [Wateree] river".

16th- and 17th-century history
This people were recorded in 1567 by Spanish captain Juan Pardo's scribe Juan de la Bandera during their expedition through the interior of the Carolinas. Bandera called them the Guatari in his journal, which was also given as the name of their village. Bandera described them as ruled by two female chiefs.

The Spaniards noted that Guatari was far from the coast. The settlement is believed to have been in present-day Rowan County, North Carolina. In 1670, English colonists and explorers mentioned the Wateree as inhabiting the area of the upper Yadkin River, to the northwest of their later habitat.

18th-century history

By 1700, when observed by John Lawson's expedition, the Wateree had migrated south to settle along the Wateree River near the site of present-day Camden, South Carolina. The British observed that the chiefs of the Wateree had a higher degree of power than those of other Indian tribes of the region. 

Originally a large tribe, the Wateree had their power broken during the Yamasee War of 1715 against Carolina colonists. The Wateree became allies in a tribal confederation dominated by the Catawba. The latter tribe absorbed remnant bands of many other tribes of the region from the chaos of intertribal fighting.

 "James Adair heard more than twenty different languages spoken by the Indians in the Catawba River settlements when he traded there between 1736 and 1743. This included Eno, Cheraw, Wateree,  Congaree, Natchez, Yamasee, Coosah, and others. He could probably have added Saponi, Waccamaw, Pedee, Santee and others to his list.  The groups varied in size. If large enough, each language tribe tended to create its own village and appoint its own leaders."

The Wateree appeared to have been able to maintain their culture and distinct language as late as 1744.  A record of land sale noted that Wateree Indians sold to a white man. The tribe as a group culture has become extinct, but some present-day Catawba are likely genetic descendants of the Wateree.

Notes

References 
 
 Mooney, James. Siouan Tribes of the East. Washington, DC.: Government Printing Press, 1894.
 Swanton, John R. The Indian Tribes of North America. Washington, DC: Smithsonian Institution Press, 1952; reprint, 1984, pp. 90–92.
 Adair, James. History of the American Indians. Publisher: Printed for Edward and Charles Dilly, London, 1775.

Indigenous peoples of the Southeastern Woodlands
Siouan peoples
Native American history of North Carolina
Native American history of South Carolina
Native American tribes in North Carolina
Native American tribes in South Carolina